Naty Liliana Rangel de la Concha (born 10 August 1988) is a Mexican badminton player. She was part of the national team that competed at the 2006 Central American and Caribbean Games and won a gold medal in the women's doubles event also two bronze medals from mixed doubles and team events. Rangel participated at the 2007 and 2011 Pan American Games.

Achievements

Pan Am Championships 
Women's doubles

Central American and Caribbean Games 
Women's doubles

Mixed doubles

BWF International Challenge/Series 
Women's doubles

Mixed doubles

  BWF International Challenge tournament
  BWF International Series tournament
  BWF Future Series tournament

References

External links 
 

1988 births
Living people
Mexican female badminton players
Badminton players at the 2007 Pan American Games
Badminton players at the 2011 Pan American Games
Competitors at the 2006 Central American and Caribbean Games
Central American and Caribbean Games gold medalists for Mexico
Central American and Caribbean Games bronze medalists for Mexico
Central American and Caribbean Games medalists in badminton
Pan American Games competitors for Mexico
21st-century Mexican women